Mason City High School is a  public high school in the Mason City Community School District. It is within the city of Mason City, Iowa. It is located in Cerro Gordo County.  The school colors are black and red. Until recently, the mascot was a Mohawk (Indian Tribe figure). The current mascot is Riverhawk.

History
Mason City High School was established in 1890. A new building was erected at 22 N. Georgia Ave. in 1917. The current high school building at 1700 4th St. SE was constructed in 1966 after the 1917 building became over crowded due to the rapidly growing student population during the 1946-1964 Baby Boom. Later, the 1917 building was renovated into a public services office building, and is called Mohawk Square. 

The current building shares its campus with John Adams Middle School (7-8 grade), which was built in the early 1960s as a junior high school.

Demographics
The demographic breakdown of the 1008 students enrolled in 2013-2014 was:
Male - 49.6%
Female - 50.4%
Native American/Alaskan - 0.4%
Asian/Pacific islanders - 1.4%
Black - 3.6%
Hispanic - 7.8%
White - 84.5%
Multiracial - 2.3%

40.4% of the students were eligible for free or reduced lunch.

Athletics
MCHS's programs include football, volleyball, cross country, football cheerleading, girls’ basketball, boys’ basketball, wrestling, dance team, basketball cheerleading, girls’ track, boys’ track, girls’ golf, boys’ golf, baseball, boys' tennis, girls' tennis, boys' swimming, girls' swimming, boys' hockey, girls' hockey, boys' soccer, girls' soccer,  softball, and a recent addition of mountain biking. All which compete as the Mohawks. MCHS is a member of in the Central Iowa Metropolitan League's Iowa Division. The conference is made up of three six-team divisions. The other two divisions are called the Metro and the Central. With 810 students in four grades as of the 2018–2019 school year, MCHS is among the smaller schools in the league. In early 2020, there was some talk of switching to the seven-member Northeast Iowa Conference, where Mason City would be far and away the largest school.

State Championships
Cheerleading (6-time State Campions - 1996, 1997, 2005, 2018, 2020, 2021)
Dance (17-time State Champions - 2003, 2004, 2006, 2007, 2008, 2009, 2010, 2011, 2012, 2014, 2015, 2016, 2017, 2018, 2019, 2020, 2021)
Baseball (7-time State Champions - 1935, 1937, 1938, 1946, 1956, 1972 (Spring), 1972 (Summer))
Boys' Basketball (5-time State Champions - 1935, 1940, 1943, 1996, 1997)
Girls' Basketball (2016 State Champions)
Boys' Cross Country (2-time State Champions - 1972, 1973)
Football (1978 State Champions)
Boys' Swimming (3-time State Champions - 1975, 1979, 1991)
Girls' Swimming (3-time State Champions - 1988, 1989, 2009)
Boys' Track and Field (3-time State Champions - 1918, 1929, 1930)
Volleyball (1973 State Champions)
Wrestling (3-time State Champions - 1922, 1949, 1950)

Notable alumni
 Robert Meredith Willson, American playwright, composer, and flutist
 Eddie Anderson, former NFL player and coach
 Jeff Horner, college and professional basketball player 
 Joe Lillard, former NFL player
 Dean Oliver, college and professional basketball player
 Tom Randall, former NFL player
 Dennis Remmert, former NFL player
 Tanna Frederick, actress

See also
List of high schools in Iowa

References

External links
  School district website

Public high schools in Iowa
Schools in Cerro Gordo County, Iowa
Buildings and structures in Mason City, Iowa
Iowa High School Athletic Association
1890 establishments in Iowa